Arlotto of Prato (died 1286) was an Italian Franciscan theologian. He became Minister General of the Order of Friars Minor at the end of his life.

Arlotto is known also for the Quaestio de Aeternitate Mundi, and as a Biblical scholar. He compiled a Bible concordance, of the Latin Vulgate. This is sometimes cited as the first such. It was in fact based on an earlier thirteenth century work of Hugh of St. Cher. The Jewish Encyclopedia states that Arlotto's work was then used as a model for a Hebrew Bible concordance, by Isaac Nathan ben Kalonymus.

Notes

External links

13th-century births
1286 deaths
People from Prato
Italian Friars Minor
Franciscan theologians
Ministers General of the Order of Friars Minor
13th-century Italian Roman Catholic theologians
Italian biblical scholars